Engelbert of the Mark or Englebert of La Marck may refer to:

Engelbert I of the Mark
Engelbert II of the Mark
Engelbert III of the Mark
Engelbert III of the Mark (archbishop)